Dharma Rao or Dharmarao may refer to:

Alapati Dharma Rao, former Home Minister of Andhra Pradesh, India.
Tapi Dharma Rao, Indian writer and Sahitya Akademi Award winner.